Spirulina albida  is a chlorophyll-free, heterotrophic and saprotrophic freshwater cyanobacterium from the genus Spirulina. "Spirulina albida" occur in surface films.

References

Further reading 
 
 
 
 
 
 

 

Spirulinales
Bacteria described in 1909